The hip hop subculture in the Czech Republic emerged after the Velvet Revolution in 1989. Since then the subculture has become an influential urban phenomenon, with hip hop groups, clubs and festivals appearing across the country. Notable hip hop artists from the Czech Republic include Chaozz, Gipsy.cz, Naše Věc and Prago Union.

Festivals

Hip Hop Kemp is an international hip hop festival held every year in late August in Eastern Bohemia. It has been running since 2002, and is one of the biggest hip-hop festivals in Europe with an audience of 20,000. Originally staged at the areál koupaliště Cihelna in Pardubice, it has since moved to Festival Park, Hradec Králové. 

The festival has multiple stages, and features a line up of local and international DJs, artists, breakdancers and graffiti artists over three days. The main stage has English-speaking hosts alongside the Czech language hosts. As well as hip hop, smaller stages feature other related genres including grime, dubstep, and club music. In 2013, artists included Big Daddy Kane, De La Soul, Kendrick Lamar, Lords of the Underground, Fashawn and Guilty Simpson.

Urban Rapublic is a Czech and German hip hop and reggae festival held annually in June. The 2005 line-Up featured artists including Scratch, Tajai and Souls Of Mischief, Phi Life Cypher, The Regime, and Zion I.

See also
Hip hop

References

External links
Hip Hop Kemp website